Baumannia can refer to:

 Candidatus Baumannia, a candidatus genus of bacteria including Ca. Baumannia cicadellinicola
 Knoxia, a genus of plant formerly known as Baumannia